Celil Oker (1952 – 5 May 2019) was a Turkish crime fiction writer.

Biography 

After studying at Talas Amerikan Junior School, he graduated from Tarsus American High School. Subsequently, he moved to Istanbul and studied at Boğaziçi University. After graduating from the English Language and Literature department in 1971, he worked as a translator, journalist and encyclopedia writer. He transferred to advertising as a copywriter in various prominent agencies. After more than a decade as a partner in an agency he co-founded, he quit the industry in 1999. Subsequently he worked as a full-time lecturer in the Communication Faculty of Istanbul Bilgi University. He married and he has two children. In 2004, Celil Oker, Pınar Kur, Elif Safak, Murathan Mungan and Faruk Ulay wrote a novel. Five authors each of whom continued to write when the other one left it unfinished. He died in Istanbul on May 5, 2019.

Works

Novels
 Çıplak Ceset, April 1999
 Kramponlu Ceset, October 1999
 Bin Lotluk Ceset, July 2000
 Rol Çalan Ceset, July 2001
 Son Ceset, January 2004
 Bir Şapka Bir Tabanca, October 2005
 Yenik ve Yalnız,  August 2010
 Beyaz Eldiven Sarı Zarf, September 2011
 Sen Ölürsün Ben Yaşarım, December 2015

Other
 Beşpeşe. with Murathan Mungan, Pınar Kür, Faruk Ulay, Elif Şafak. (June 2004)

Award 
He won Kaktüs Kahvesi awards with his first novel Çıplak Ceset, 1998.

References 

1952 births
2019 deaths
People from Kayseri
Boğaziçi University alumni
Academic staff of Istanbul Bilgi University
Turkish crime fiction writers
Turkish novelists
Crime novelists